Atractus elaps, the broadhead ground snake, is a species of snake in the family Colubridae. The species can be found in Colombia, French Guiana, Bolivia, Peru, Suriname, and Brazil.

References 

Atractus
Reptiles of Colombia
Reptiles of French Guiana
Reptiles of Bolivia
Reptiles of Peru
Reptiles of Suriname
Reptiles of Brazil
Snakes of South America
Reptiles described in 1868
Taxa named by Albert Günther